Derolathrus cavernicolus is a species of Jacobson's beetle in the family Jacobsoniidae. It is found in the Caribbean Sea and North America.

References

Further reading

 
 

Polyphaga
Articles created by Qbugbot
Beetles described in 2010